The title of ek prosopou, meaning "representative", was widely used in the middle Byzantine Empire (9th–12th centuries) for deputies of various office holders.

The title could be applied in a generic sense to any senior official, such as the strategos of a theme, who was in a sense the deputy of the Byzantine Emperor. In a more technical sense, as used in the Taktika or lists of offices of the 9th–11th centuries, it was used by subordinate officials who deputized for a strategos or other provincial governor or one of the central government ministries for a specific district (called ekprosopike by Kekaumenos). The same usage is also attested in the ecclesiastical hierarchy.

Sources
 
 

Byzantine titles and offices
Greek words and phrases